The Town of Crowley is a Statutory Town in Crowley County, Colorado, United States. The town population was 166 at the 2020 United States Census.

Geography
Crowley is located in southern Crowley County at  (38.193614, -103.857802). Colorado State Highway 96 leads east  to Ordway, the county seat, and west  to Pueblo. Highway 207 leads south  to Manzanola and U.S. Route 50.

Demographics

As of the census of 2000, there were 187 people, 76 households, and 48 families residing in the town. The racial makeup of the town was 82.35% White, 1.60% African American, 2.67% Native American, 12.30% from other races, and 1.07% from two or more races. Hispanic or Latino of any race were 39.04% of the population.

There were 76 households, out of which 27.6% had children under the age of 18 living with them, 44.7% were married couples living together, 14.5% had a female householder with no husband present, and 36.8% were non-families. 31.6% of all households were made up of individuals, and 14.5% had someone living alone who was 65 years of age or older.  The average household size was 2.46 and the average family size was 3.19.

In the town, the population was spread out, with 25.7% under the age of 18, 11.2% from 18 to 24, 21.9% from 25 to 44, 23.5% from 45 to 64, and 17.6% who were 65 years of age or older.  The median age was 40 years. For every 100 females, there were 98.9 males.  For every 100 females age 18 and over, there were 93.1 males.

The median income for a household in the town was $30,313, and the median income for a family was $32,083. Males had a median income of $21,875 versus $20,500 for females. The per capita income for the town was $11,119.  About 8.3% of families and 15.3% of the population were below the poverty line, including 22.0% of those under the age of eighteen and 24.0% of those 65 or over.

Notable people
Jonathan Almanzar (founder of Chick'nCone)

See also

 List of municipalities in Colorado

References

External links

 
 CDOT map of the Town of Crowley

Towns in Crowley County, Colorado
Towns in Colorado